The 1959 Philadelphia Phillies season was the 77th season in the history of the franchise. During spring training, manager Eddie Sawyer told the press, "We're definitely not a last place club... I think the biggest thing we've accomplished is getting rid of the losing complex. That alone makes us not a last place club." The Phillies finished in last place in 1959, seven games behind seventh-place St. Louis and 23 games behind the pennant and World Series winning Dodgers. They attracted 802,515 fans to Connie Mack Stadium, seventh in the eight-team league.

Offseason 
In early 1959, Phillies owner Bob Carpenter proposed building a new ballpark for the Phillies on  adjacent to the Garden State Park Racetrack in Cherry Hill, New Jersey. Connie Mack Stadium was 50 years old, did not have sufficient parking, and the sale of alcohol was banned at sports venues in Pennsylvania. Beer sales were legal in New Jersey. The proposed ballpark would have seated 45,000 fans, been expandable to 60,000, and would have had 15,000 parking spaces. The Phillies would eventually move to the South Philadelphia Sports Complex in 1971. On January 13, Carpenter also changed general managers, replacing Roy Hamey with John J. Quinn, recruited from the defending two-time National League champion Milwaukee Braves. Quinn would run the Phils' front office for almost 14 full seasons.

Notable transactions 
 December 1, 1958: Johnny O'Brien was drafted by the Phillies from the St. Louis Cardinals in the 1958 rule 5 draft. 
 December 2, 1958: John Herrnstein was signed as an amateur free agent by the Phillies.
 December 3, 1958: Chuck Essegian was traded by the Phillies to the St. Louis Cardinals for Rubén Amaro.
 December 3, 1958: Jack Sanford was traded by the Phillies to the San Francisco Giants for Rubén Gómez and Valmy Thomas.
 December 23, 1958: Rip Repulski, Jim Golden and Gene Snyder were traded by the Phillies to the Los Angeles Dodgers for Sparky Anderson.
 March 31, 1959: Johnny O'Brien, Ted Kazanski and Stan Lopata were traded by the Phillies to the Milwaukee Braves for Gene Conley, Harry Hanebrink and Joe Koppe.
 Prior to 1959 season: John Anderson was returned by the Phillies to the Miami Marlins after expiration of their minor league working agreement.

Regular season 
On April 11, coach Benny Bengough was removed from the coaching staff and reassigned to the front office where he worked in team public relations.

Season standings

Record vs. opponents

Notable transactions 
 April 13, 1959: Bobby Del Greco was purchased by the Phillies from the New York Yankees.
 June 5, 1959: Gary Kroll was signed as an amateur free agent by the Phillies.
 June 6, 1959: Willie Jones was traded by the Phillies to the Cleveland Indians for Jim Bolger and cash.

Game log

|- style="background:#bfb"
| 1 || April 10 || Reds || 2–1 || Robin Roberts (1–0) || Don Newcombe (0–1) || None || 22,189 || 1–0
|- style="background:#bbb"
| – || April 11 || Reds || colspan=6 | Postponed (rain); 
|- style="background:#bbb"
| – || April 12  || Reds || colspan=6 | Postponed (rain); 
|- style="background:#bbb"
| – || April 12  || Reds || colspan=6 | Postponed (rain); 
|- style="background:#fbb"
| 2 || April 14 || @ Braves || 3–4  || Don McMahon (1–0) || Turk Farrell (0–1) || None || 42,081 || 1–1
|- style="background:#fbb"
| 3 || April 16 || @ Braves || 3–7 || Lew Burdette (2–0) || Jack Meyer (0–1) || None || 11,186 || 1–2
|- style="background:#bfb"
| 4 || April 17 || @ Reds || 5–1 || Ray Semproch (1–0) || Brooks Lawrence (0–1) || None || 8,376 || 2–2
|- style="background:#bfb"
| 5 || April 18 || @ Reds || 14–9 || Al Schroll (1–0) || Don Newcombe (0–2) || None || 2,890 || 3–2
|- style="background:#fbb"
| 6 || April 19 || @ Reds || 5–12 || Bob Mabe (1–0) || Jim Owens (0–1) || None || 8,091 || 3–3
|- style="background:#bbb"
| – || April 20 || @ Pirates || colspan=6 | Postponed (rain, wet grounds); 
|- style="background:#fbb"
| 7 || April 22 || Braves || 0–2 || Lew Burdette (3–0) || Robin Roberts (1–1) || None || 14,228 || 3–4
|- style="background:#bfb"
| 8 || April 23 || Braves || 4–3 || Ray Semproch (2–0) || Juan Pizarro (0–1) || None || 8,689 || 4–4
|- style="background:#fbb"
| 9 || April 24 || Pirates || 5–8 || Roy Face (2–0) || Al Schroll (1–1) || None || 15,675 || 4–5
|- style="background:#fbb"
| 10 || April 25 || Pirates || 2–4 || Harvey Haddix (1–0) || Seth Morehead (0–1) || None || 6,678 || 4–6
|- style="background:#fbb"
| 11 || April 26  || Pirates || 2–9 || Vern Law (2–1) || Don Cardwell (0–1) || None ||  || 4–7
|- style="background:#bfb"
| 12 || April 26  || Pirates || 10–5 || Jack Meyer (1–1) || Bob Friend (0–3) || None || 19,266 || 5–7
|- style="background:#bbb"
| – || April 27 || Giants || colspan=6 | Postponed (rain); 
|- style="background:#bbb"
| – || April 28 || Giants || colspan=6 | Postponed (rain, cold weather); 
|- style="background:#bfb"
| 13 || April 29 || Dodgers || 5–4 || Jack Meyer (2–1) || Johnny Podres (2–2) || None || 13,775 || 6–7
|- style="background:#fbb"
| 14 || April 30 || Dodgers || 4–6 || Johnny Klippstein (3–0) || Ray Semproch (2–1) || Art Fowler (1) || 11,547 || 6–8

|- style="background:#bfb"
| 15 || May 1 || Cubs || 4–2 || Jim Owens (1–1) || Glen Hobbie (2–2) || None || 9,054 || 7–8
|- style="background:#fbb"
| 16 || May 2 || Cubs || 3–4 || Joe Schaffernoth (1–0) || Seth Morehead (0–2) || Don Elston (5) || 4,171 || 7–9
|- style="background:#fbb"
| 17 || May 3  || Cubs || 3–4 || John Buzhardt (1–2) || Turk Farrell (0–2) || Don Elston (6) ||  || 7–10
|- style="background:#bfb"
| 18 || May 3  || Cubs || 5–4 || Jack Meyer (3–1) || Bill Henry (2–1) || None || 13,660 || 8–10
|- style="background:#bfb"
| 19 || May 5 || Cardinals || 8–7 || Turk Farrell (1–2) || Larry Jackson (0–4) || None || 12,023 || 9–10
|- style="background:#fbb"
| 20 || May 6 || Cardinals || 7–8 || Howie Nunn (1–1) || Jack Meyer (3–2) || Jim Brosnan (2) || 12,005 || 9–11
|- style="background:#fbb"
| 21 || May 7 || @ Pirates || 4–5  || Roy Face (4–0) || Jim Owens (1–2) || None || 10,358 || 9–12
|- style="background:#bfb"
| 22 || May 8 || @ Pirates || 8–1 || Gene Conley (1–0) || Red Witt (0–4) || Turk Farrell (1) || 17,691 || 10–12
|- style="background:#fbb"
| 23 || May 9 || @ Pirates || 1–9 || Ron Kline (3–1) || Rubén Gómez (0–1) || None || 9,633 || 10–13
|- style="background:#bfb"
| 24 || May 10  || @ Pirates || 6–3 || Robin Roberts (2–1) || Bob Friend (0–6) || Turk Farrell (2) ||  || 11–13
|- style="background:#fbb"
| 25 || May 10  || @ Pirates || 6–7 || Harvey Haddix (3–1) || Jim Hearn (0–1) || Roy Face (2) || 23,549 || 11–14
|- style="background:#fbb"
| 26 || May 11 || @ Dodgers || 10–11 || Art Fowler (3–2) || Jim Hearn (0–2) || None || 13,524 || 11–15
|- style="background:#fbb"
| 27 || May 12 || @ Dodgers || 1–3 || Danny McDevitt (2–1) || Gene Conley (1–1) || None || 12,562 || 11–16
|- style="background:#fbb"
| 28 || May 13 || @ Giants || 0–6 || Sam Jones (3–4) || Rubén Gómez (0–2) || None || 5,128 || 11–17
|- style="background:#fbb"
| 29 || May 14 || @ Giants || 0–8 || Mike McCormick (1–2) || Ray Semproch (2–2) || None || 6,235 || 11–18
|- style="background:#fbb"
| 30 || May 15 || @ Cardinals || 2–8 || Vinegar Bend Mizell (4–1) || Robin Roberts (2–2) || None || 6,003 || 11–19
|- style="background:#fbb"
| 31 || May 16 || @ Cardinals || 2–8 || Gary Blaylock (3–1) || Jim Owens (1–3) || None || 6,609 || 11–20
|- style="background:#bbb"
| – || May 17  || @ Cardinals || colspan=6 | Postponed (rain); 
|- style="background:#bbb"
| – || May 17  || @ Cardinals || colspan=6 | Postponed (rain); 
|- style="background:#fbb"
| 32 || May 19 || @ Cubs || 7–8 || Don Elston (3–1) || Taylor Phillips (0–3) || None || 2,436 || 11–21
|- style="background:#fbb"
| 33 || May 20 || @ Cubs || 5–7 || Moe Drabowsky (2–3) || Don Cardwell (0–2) || Don Elston (7) || 4,825 || 11–22
|- style="background:#bfb"
| 34 || May 21 || @ Cubs || 3–0 || Rubén Gómez (1–2) || Bob Anderson (2–3) || None || 3,725 || 12–22
|- style="background:#fbb"
| 35 || May 22 || Braves || 5–10 || Lew Burdette (7–2) || Robin Roberts (2–3) || None || 24,043 || 12–23
|- style="background:#bfb"
| 36 || May 23 || Braves || 4–2 || Jim Owens (2–3) || Warren Spahn (5–5) || None || 8,346 || 13–23
|- style="background:#bfb"
| 37 || May 24  || Braves || 6–0 || Gene Conley (2–1) || Joey Jay (2–2) || None ||  || 14–23
|- style="background:#fbb"
| 38 || May 24  || Braves || 3–8 || Carl Willey (2–1) || Taylor Phillips (0–4) || None || 26,646 || 14–24
|- style="background:#bfb"
| 39 || May 25 || Braves || 7–3 || Don Cardwell (1–2) || Bob Buhl (2–3) || Ray Semproch (1) || 16,681 || 15–24
|- style="background:#fbb"
| 40 || May 26 || @ Reds || 1–2 || Don Newcombe (4–4) || Rubén Gómez (1–3) || None || 7,312 || 15–25
|- style="background:#fbb"
| 41 || May 27 || @ Reds || 4–10 || Bob Purkey (5–5) || Robin Roberts (2–4) || None || 5,348 || 15–26
|- style="background:#bfb"
| 42 || May 28 || @ Reds || 4–3 || Jim Owens (3–3) || Joe Nuxhall (2–3) || Ray Semproch (2) || 6,819 || 16–26
|- style="background:#fbb"
| 43 || May 29 || @ Braves || 5–6 || Don McMahon (2–0) || Gene Conley (2–2) || None || 20,334 || 16–27
|- style="background:#fbb"
| 44 || May 30 || @ Braves || 2–4 || Bob Buhl (3–3) || Don Cardwell (1–3) || None || 18,945 || 16–28
|- style="background:#bfb"
| 45 || May 31  || @ Braves || 6–0 || Robin Roberts (3–4) || Lew Burdette (8–3) || None ||  || 17–28
|- style="background:#fbb"
| 46 || May 31  || @ Braves || 1–2 || Warren Spahn (7–5) || Ray Semproch (2–3) || None || 28,590 || 17–29

|- style="background:#bbb"
| – || June 2 || Cubs || colspan=6 | Postponed (rain); 
|- style="background:#bfb"
| 47 || June 3 || Cubs || 4–3 || Jim Owens (4–3) || Dave Hillman (3–4) || None || 7,883 || 18–29
|- style="background:#fbb"
| 48 || June 4 || Cubs || 2–3  || Don Elston (4–1) || Gene Conley (2–3) || None || 7,445 || 18–30
|- style="background:#bbb"
| – || June 5 || Cardinals || colspan=6 | Postponed (rain); 
|- style="background:#bfb"
| 49 || June 6 || Cardinals || 4–3  || Robin Roberts (4–4) || Lindy McDaniel (3–8) || None || 5,940 || 19–30
|- style="background:#bfb"
| 50 || June 7  || Cardinals || 11–9 || Jack Meyer (4–2) || Ernie Broglio (0–5) || Gene Conley (1) ||  || 20–30
|- style="background:#fbb"
| 51 || June 7  || Cardinals || 0–2 || Vinegar Bend Mizell (7–2) || Don Cardwell (1–4) || None || 15,742 || 20–31
|- style="background:#fbb"
| 52 || June 9 || Dodgers || 2–3 || Stan Williams (3–1) || Ray Semproch (2–4) || Sandy Koufax (1) || 16,575 || 20–32
|- style="background:#bfb"
| 53 || June 10 || Dodgers || 2–1 || Gene Conley (3–3) || Danny McDevitt (3–6) || None || 11,079 || 21–32
|- style="background:#fbb"
| 54 || June 11 || Dodgers || 0–11 || Johnny Podres (7–2) || Robin Roberts (4–5) || None || 15,819 || 21–33
|- style="background:#fbb"
| 55 || June 12 || Giants || 0–3  || Mike McCormick (4–5) || Jack Meyer (4–3) || None || 20,595 || 21–34
|- style="background:#fbb"
| 56 || June 13 || Giants || 1–2 || Johnny Antonelli (9–3) || Ray Semproch (2–5) || None || 18,941 || 21–35
|- style="background:#bfb"
| 57 || June 14  || Giants || 7–5 || Humberto Robinson (2–0) || Sam Jones (7–6) || None ||  || 22–35
|- style="background:#bfb"
| 58 || June 14  || Giants || 6–3 || Robin Roberts (5–5) || Stu Miller (3–3) || None || 21,562 || 23–35
|- style="background:#fbb"
| 59 || June 16  || @ Cardinals || 1–8 || Vinegar Bend Mizell (8–3) || Rubén Gómez (1–4) || None ||  || 23–36
|- style="background:#fbb"
| 60 || June 16  || @ Cardinals || 2–5 || Ernie Broglio (1–5) || Jim Owens (4–4) || Lindy McDaniel (4) || 17,068 || 23–37
|- style="background:#fbb"
| 61 || June 17 || @ Cardinals || 4–10 || Marshall Bridges (1–0) || Humberto Robinson (2–1) || None || 16,765 || 23–38
|- style="background:#bfb"
| 62 || June 19 || @ Cubs || 8–7 || Gene Conley (4–3) || Bob Anderson (3–6) || Jim Owens (1) || 8,516 || 24–38
|- style="background:#bfb"
| 63 || June 20 || @ Cubs || 6–3 || Robin Roberts (6–5) || Dick Drott (1–1) || None || 13,557 || 25–38
|- style="background:#fbb"
| 64 || June 21 || @ Cubs || 0–4 || John Buzhardt (4–2) || Rubén Gómez (1–5) || None || 17,995 || 25–39
|- style="background:#fbb"
| 65 || June 22 || @ Dodgers || 2–6 || Sandy Koufax (4–1) || Jim Owens (4–5) || None || 10,290 || 25–40
|- style="background:#fbb"
| 66 || June 23 || @ Dodgers || 3–4 || Danny McDevitt (6–6) || Gene Conley (4–4) || None || 11,978 || 25–41
|- style="background:#fbb"
| 67 || June 24 || @ Dodgers || 6–9 || Roger Craig (2–0) || Don Cardwell (1–5) || Clem Labine (7) || 17,315 || 25–42
|- style="background:#fbb"
| 68 || June 25 || @ Dodgers || 2–5 || Don Drysdale (8–5) || Robin Roberts (6–6) || None || 14,662 || 25–43
|- style="background:#fbb"
| 69 || June 26 || @ Giants || 0–8 || Mike McCormick (6–7) || Jim Owens (4–6) || None || 15,816 || 25–44
|- style="background:#bfb"
| 70 || June 27 || @ Giants || 7–4 || Gene Conley (5–4) || Sam Jones (8–8) || None || 16,194 || 26–44
|- style="background:#fbb"
| 71 || June 28 || @ Giants || 0–6 || Johnny Antonelli (11–4) || Ray Semproch (2–6) || None || 20,793 || 26–45
|- style="background:#fbb"
| 72 || June 30 || Pirates || 3–4 || Harvey Haddix (6–6) || Robin Roberts (6–7) || Roy Face (8) || 11,149 || 26–46

|- style="background:#bfb"
| 73 || July 1 || Pirates || 1–0 || Gene Conley (6–4) || Ron Kline (6–6) || None || 7,897 || 27–46
|- style="background:#bfb"
| 74 || July 2  || Reds || 7–6 || Don Cardwell (2–5) || Jim Brosnan (3–4) || Turk Farrell (3) ||  || 28–46
|- style="background:#fbb"
| 75 || July 2  || Reds || 4–8 || Don Newcombe (9–4) || Rubén Gómez (1–6) || None || 15,428 || 28–47
|- style="background:#fbb"
| 76 || July 3 || Reds || 1–6 || Jim O'Toole (1–2) || Jim Owens (4–7) || Brooks Lawrence (1) || 7,184 || 28–48
|- style="background:#bfb"
| 77 || July 4 || Braves || 2–1 || Robin Roberts (7–7) || Lew Burdette (11–8) || None || 16,775 || 29–48
|- style="background:#fbb"
| 78 || July 5 || Braves || 0–5 || Carl Willey (4–2) || Gene Conley (6–5) || None || 9,768 || 29–49
|- style="background:#bbcaff;"
| – || July 7 ||colspan=7 |1959 Major League Baseball All-Star Game at Forbes Field in Pittsburgh
|- style="background:#bfb"
| 79 || July 9  || Cardinals || 11–0 || Gene Conley (7–5) || Ernie Broglio (3–6) || None ||  || 30–49
|- style="background:#fbb"
| 80 || July 9  || Cardinals || 2–6 || Larry Jackson (8–7) || Robin Roberts (7–8) || None || 20,282 || 30–50
|- style="background:#fbb"
| 81 || July 10 || Cardinals || 7–9 || Vinegar Bend Mizell (10–3) || Jim Owens (4–8) || Lindy McDaniel (10) || 6,946 || 30–51
|- style="background:#fbb"
| 82 || July 11 || Cardinals || 3–4 || Marshall Bridges (3–0) || Don Cardwell (2–6) || Dean Stone (1) || 4,815 || 30–52
|- style="background:#fbb"
| 83 || July 12  || Cubs || 6–7 || Art Ceccarelli (1–0) || Rubén Gómez (1–7) || Bill Henry (7) ||  || 30–53
|- style="background:#bfb"
| 84 || July 12  || Cubs || 4–1 || Ray Semproch (3–6) || Moe Drabowsky (4–7) || None || 6,519 || 31–53
|- style="background:#bbb"
| – || July 14  || Giants || colspan=6 | Postponed (rain, wet grounds); 
|- style="background:#bbb"
| – || July 14  || Giants || colspan=6 | Postponed (rain, wet grounds); 
|- style="background:#bbb"
| – || July 15 || Giants || colspan=6 | Postponed (rain); 
|- style="background:#bfb"
| 85 || July 16  || Giants || 6–4 || Robin Roberts (8–8) || Jack Sanford (7–9) || None ||  || 32–53
|- style="background:#fbb"
| 86 || July 16  || Giants || 0–1 || Johnny Antonelli (14–4) || Gene Conley (7–6) || None || 22,159 || 32–54
|- style="background:#bfb"
| 87 || July 17 || Dodgers || 3–2 || Jim Owens (5–8) || Roger Craig (4–1) || None || 16,686 || 33–54
|- style="background:#bfb"
| 88 || July 18 || Dodgers || 5–2 || Don Cardwell (3–6) || Danny McDevitt (8–7) || None || 8,132 || 34–54
|- style="background:#fbb"
| 89 || July 19  || Dodgers || 4–8 || Clem Labine (4–8) || Ray Semproch (3–7) || None ||  || 34–55
|- style="background:#bfb"
| 90 || July 19  || Dodgers || 3–2  || Taylor Phillips (1–4) || Johnny Podres (8–6) || None || 25,114 || 35–55
|- style="background:#bfb"
| 91 || July 21 || @ Pirates || 4–2 || Robin Roberts (9–8) || Bob Friend (4–12) || None || 25,960 || 36–55
|- style="background:#bfb"
| 92 || July 22 || @ Pirates || 11–4 || Gene Conley (8–6) || Ron Kline (7–9) || None || 17,024 || 37–55
|- style="background:#bfb"
| 93 || July 24 || @ Reds || 2–1 || Jim Owens (6–8) || Jay Hook (1–1) || Ray Semproch (3) || 11,497 || 38–55
|- style="background:#bfb"
| 94 || July 25 || @ Reds || 6–3 || Don Cardwell (4–6) || Joe Nuxhall (3–9) || Rubén Gómez (1) || 5,068 || 39–55
|- style="background:#fbb"
| 95 || July 26  || @ Reds || 2–4 || Brooks Lawrence (6–9) || Robin Roberts (9–9) || None ||  || 39–56
|- style="background:#bfb"
| 96 || July 26  || @ Reds || 6–3 || Gene Conley (9–6) || Jim O'Toole (2–4) || None || 15,557 || 40–56
|- style="background:#bfb"
| 97 || July 28 || @ Giants || 3–2 || Jim Owens (7–8) || Stu Miller (4–6) || None || 15,350 || 41–56
|- style="background:#bfb"
| 98 || July 29 || @ Giants || 3–1 || Don Cardwell (5–6) || Johnny Antonelli (14–6) || None || 10,865 || 42–56
|- style="background:#fbb"
| 99 || July 30 || @ Giants || 2–7 || Mike McCormick (10–8) || Robin Roberts (9–10) || None || 10,114 || 42–57
|- style="background:#fbb"
| 100 || July 31 || @ Dodgers || 4–5 || Don Drysdale (14–6) || Gene Conley (9–7) || None || 21,900 || 42–58

|- style="background:#fbb"
| 101 || August 1 || @ Dodgers || 3–5 || Clem Labine (5–8) || Jim Owens (7–9) || None || 30,536 || 42–59
|- style="background:#fbb"
| 102 || August 2 || @ Dodgers || 3–4 || Larry Sherry (2–2) || Don Cardwell (5–7) || None || 10,201 || 42–60
|- style="background:#bbcaff;"
| – || August 3 ||colspan=7 |1959 Major League Baseball All-Star Game at the Los Angeles Memorial Coliseum in Los Angeles
|- style="background:#bfb"
| 103 || August 4 || @ Cubs || 2–1 || Robin Roberts (10–10) || Bob Anderson (7–8) || None || 8,348 || 43–60
|- style="background:#bfb"
| 104 || August 5 || @ Cubs || 6–4 || Gene Conley (10–7) || Bill Henry (6–5) || Taylor Phillips (1) || 9,128 || 44–60
|- style="background:#fbb"
| 105 || August 6 || @ Cubs || 2–4 || Don Elston (6–4) || Humberto Robinson (2–2) || None || 6,477 || 44–61
|- style="background:#fbb"
| 106 || August 7 || @ Cardinals || 1–3 || Lindy McDaniel (11–10) || Rubén Gómez (1–8) || None || 8,764 || 44–62
|- style="background:#fbb"
| 107 || August 8  || @ Cardinals || 3–4 || Bob Miller (1–0) || Robin Roberts (10–11) || None ||  || 44–63
|- style="background:#fbb"
| 108 || August 8  || @ Cardinals || 4–5  || Lindy McDaniel (12–10) || Turk Farrell (1–3) || None || 11,296 || 44–64
|- style="background:#bfb"
| 109 || August 9  || @ Cardinals || 8–3 || Gene Conley (11–7) || Ernie Broglio (6–8) || None ||  || 45–64
|- style="background:#bfb"
| 110 || August 9  || @ Cardinals || 4–2 || Jim Owens (8–9) || Marshall Bridges (4–3) || Turk Farrell (4) || 20,129 || 46–64
|- style="background:#bfb"
| 111 || August 11 || Pirates || 6–4 || Don Cardwell (6–7) || Bob Friend (4–15) || Turk Farrell (5) || 12,127 || 47–64
|- style="background:#fbb"
| 112 || August 12 || Pirates || 2–6 || Harvey Haddix (9–9) || Robin Roberts (10–12) || None || 11,163 || 47–65
|- style="background:#fbb"
| 113 || August 14  || Reds || 13–15 || Brooks Lawrence (7–10) || Turk Farrell (1–4) || Jim Brosnan (4) ||  || 47–66
|- style="background:#fbb"
| 114 || August 14  || Reds || 4–5 || Willard Schmidt (3–2) || Jim Owens (8–10) || Don Newcombe (1) || 16,922 || 47–67
|- style="background:#fbb"
| 115 || August 15 || Reds || 3–8 || Joe Nuxhall (7–9) || Ray Semproch (3–8) || Orlando Peña (4) || 3,886 || 47–68
|- style="background:#bfb"
| 116 || August 16  || Reds || 8–5 || Robin Roberts (11–12) || Bob Purkey (10–12) || None ||  || 48–68
|- style="background:#bfb"
| 117 || August 16  || Reds || 6–0 || Don Cardwell (7–7) || Jay Hook (2–3) || None || 10,921 || 49–68
|- style="background:#fbb"
| 118 || August 17 || Cardinals || 4–5 || Vinegar Bend Mizell (12–7) || Ray Semproch (3–9) || Lindy McDaniel (13) || 6,178 || 49–69
|- style="background:#bfb"
| 119 || August 18 || Cardinals || 2–1 || Jim Owens (9–10) || Bob Miller (1–2) || None || 8,641 || 50–69
|- style="background:#bfb"
| 120 || August 19  || Cubs || 4–1 || Gene Conley (12–7) || Glen Hobbie (12–10) || None ||  || 51–69
|- style="background:#fffdd0"
| 121 || August 19  || Cubs || 7–7  || None || None || None || 13,611 || 51–69–1
|- style="background:#bfb"
| 122 || August 20  || Cubs || 8–5 || Rubén Gómez (2–8) || Moe Drabowsky (5–10) || None ||  || 52–69–1
|- style="background:#fbb"
| 123 || August 20  || Cubs || 4–6 || Bob Anderson (10–8) || Taylor Phillips  (1–5) || Bill Henry (11) || 7,929 || 52–70–1
|- style="background:#fbb"
| 124 || August 21  || Giants || 0–6 || Johnny Antonelli (17–7) || Robin Roberts (11–13) || None ||  || 52–71–1
|- style="background:#fbb"
| 125 || August 21  || Giants || 6–10 || Mike McCormick (11–10) || Ray Semproch (3–10) || Stu Miller (7) || 28,164 || 52–72–1
|- style="background:#fbb"
| 126 || August 22 || Giants || 1–8 || Al Worthington (2–2) || Jim Owens (9–11) || Gordon Jones (2) || 9,888 || 52–73–1
|- style="background:#bbb"
| – || August 23  || Giants || colspan=6 | Postponed (rain); 
|- style="background:#bbb"
| – || August 23  || Giants || colspan=6 | Postponed (rain); 
|- style="background:#fbb"
| 127 || August 24 || Dodgers || 2–8 || Sandy Koufax (7–4) || Ed Keegan (0–1) || None || 10,832 || 52–74–1
|- style="background:#fbb"
| 128 || August 25 || Dodgers || 2–5 || Johnny Podres (12–7) || Robin Roberts (11–14) || Larry Sherry (2) || 18,140 || 52–75–1
|- style="background:#bfb"
| 129 || August 27  || Giants || 7–2 || Jim Owens (10–11) || Mike McCormick (11–11) || None ||  || 53–75–1
|- style="background:#bfb"
| 130 || August 27  || Giants || 2–1 || Don Cardwell (8–7) || Al Worthington (2–3) || Turk Farrell (6) || 14,538 || 54–75–1
|- style="background:#fbb"
| 131 || August 28 || @ Pirates || 0–9 || Vern Law (15–7) || Ed Keegan (0–2) || None || 20,926 || 54–76–1
|- style="background:#fbb"
| 132 || August 29 || @ Pirates || 1–11 || Bob Friend (8–15) || Robin Roberts (11–15) || None || 9,714 || 54–77–1
|- style="background:#fbb"
| 133 || August 30  || @ Pirates || 1–2 || Harvey Haddix (11–9) || Humberto Robinson (2–3) || None ||  || 54–78–1
|- style="background:#fbb"
| 134 || August 30  || @ Pirates || 6–7  || Roy Face (17–0) || Turk Farrell (1–5) || None || 20,015 || 54–79–1

|- style="background:#bfb"
| 135 || September 1 || @ Braves || 5–3 || Don Cardwell (9–7) || Bob Buhl (11–9) || None || 20,522 || 55–79–1
|- style="background:#bfb"
| 136 || September 2 || @ Braves || 11–5 || Robin Roberts (12–15) || Lew Burdette (18–14) || None || 18,047 || 56–79–1
|- style="background:#bfb"
| 137 || September 4 || Pirates || 3–0 || Jim Owens (11–11) || Harvey Haddix (11–10) || None || 13,136 || 57–79–1
|- style="background:#fbb"
| 138 || September 5 || Pirates || 6–7 || Bob Porterfield (1–2) || Turk Farrell (1–6) || Bennie Daniels (1) || 5,993 || 57–80–1
|- style="background:#bfb"
| 139 || September 6 || Pirates || 2–1 || Robin Roberts (13–15) || Vern Law (15–9) || None || 9,684 || 58–80–1
|- style="background:#bfb"
| 140 || September 7 || @ Reds || 6–4 || Rubén Gómez (3–8) || Orlando Peña (4–8) || None || 5,624 || 59–80–1
|- style="background:#fbb"
| 141 || September 9 || @ Dodgers || 0–1 || Don Drysdale (16–12) || Taylor Phillips (1–6) || None || 13,877 || 59–81–1
|- style="background:#fbb"
| 142 || September 10 || @ Dodgers || 0–5 || Roger Craig (8–5) || Don Cardwell (9–8) || None || 15,434 || 59–82–1
|- style="background:#bfb"
| 143 || September 11 || @ Giants || 1–0 || Robin Roberts (14–15) || Mike McCormick (11–14) || None || 22,222 || 60–82–1
|- style="background:#fbb"
| 144 || September 12 || @ Giants || 1–9 || Sam Jones (20–12) || Humberto Robinson (2–4) || None || 21,133 || 60–83–1
|- style="background:#fbb"
| 145 || September 13 || @ Giants || 0–1 || Jack Sanford (14–12) || Don Cardwell (9–9) || Mike McCormick (4) || 21,841 || 60–84–1
|- style="background:#fbb"
| 146 || September 15 || @ Cardinals || 4–6 || Ernie Broglio (7–12) || Ed Keegan (0–3) || None || 5,327 || 60–85–1
|- style="background:#bfb"
| 147 || September 17 || @ Cubs || 5–2 || Robin Roberts (15–15) || Glen Hobbie (15–13) || None || 598 || 61–85–1
|- style="background:#fbb"
| 148 || September 18 || @ Cubs || 4–5  || Dave Hillman (7–11) || Bob Bowman (0–1) || None || 971 || 61–86–1
|- style="background:#fbb"
| 149 || September 19 || Braves || 3–9 || Bob Buhl (14–9) || Don Cardwell (9–10) || None || 17,216 || 61–87–1
|- style="background:#fbb"
| 150 || September 20 || Braves || 5–8 || Joey Jay (6–10) || Robin Roberts (15–16) || None || 13,202 || 61–88–1
|- style="background:#bfb"
| 151 || September 22  || Reds || 3–1 || Jim Owens (12–11) || Orlando Peña (5–9) || None ||  || 62–88–1
|- style="background:#bfb"
| 152 || September 22  || Reds || 3–2 || Humberto Robinson (3–4) || Bob Purkey (12–18) || Jack Meyer (1) || 8,533 || 63–88–1
|- style="background:#bfb"
| 153 || September 25 || @ Braves || 6–3 || Jack Meyer (5–3) || Lew Burdette (21–15) || None || 24,912 || 64–88–1
|- style="background:#fbb"
| 154 || September 26 || @ Braves || 2–3 || Warren Spahn (21–15) || Robin Roberts (15–17) || None || 23,763 || 64–89–1
|- style="background:#fbb"
| 155 || September 27 || @ Braves || 2–5 || Bob Buhl (15–9) || Jim Owens (12–12) || Don McMahon (15) || 48,642 || 64–90–1

|-
| style="font-size:88%" |
The second game on April 26 was protested by the Pirates in the top of the first inning. The protest was later denied.
The second game on May 10 was suspended (Sunday curfew) in the bottom of the eighth inning with the score 4–6 and was completed July 21, 1959.
|-
|  Source:

Roster

Player stats

Batting

Starters by position 
Note: Pos = Position; G = Games played; AB = At bats; H = Hits; Avg. = Batting average; HR = Home runs; RBI = Runs batted in

Other batters 
Note: G = Games played; AB = At bats; H = Hits; Avg. = Batting average; HR = Home runs; RBI = Runs batted in

Pitching

Starting pitchers 
Note: G = Games pitched; IP = Innings pitched; W = Wins; L = Losses; ERA = Earned run average; SO = Strikeouts

Other pitchers 
Note: G = Games pitched; IP = Innings pitched; W = Wins; L = Losses; ERA = Earned run average; SO = Strikeouts

Relief pitchers 
Note: G = Games pitched; W = Wins; L = Losses; SV = Saves; ERA = Earned run average; SO = Strikeouts

Farm system

Notes

References 
1959 Philadelphia Phillies season at Baseball Reference

Philadelphia Phillies seasons
Philadelphia Phillies season
Philadelphia